Sentinel Island is a granite island, with an area of 10 ha, in south-eastern Australia.  It is part of Tasmania’s Sentinel Island Group, lying in eastern Bass Strait off the north-west coast of Flinders Island in the Furneaux Group.  Until 1985 it was used for grazing sheep.

Sentinel Island Group
The Sentinel Island Group includes:

 Sentinel Island
 Gossys Reef
 Little Island

Fauna
Seabirds and waders recorded as breeding on the island include little penguin, short-tailed shearwater, common diving-petrel, white-faced storm-petrel, silver gull, Pacific gull, Caspian tern and sooty oystercatcher.  The metallic skink is present.

See also

 List of islands of Tasmania

References

Furneaux Group